A dad joke is a short joke, typically a pun, presented as a one-liner or a question and answer, but not a narrative. Generally inoffensive, dad jokes are stereotypically told with sincere humorous intent, or to intentionally provoke a negative reaction to their overly-simplistic humor.

Many dad jokes may be considered anti-jokes, deriving humor from an intentionally not funny punchline.

A common type of dad joke goes as follows:  A child will say to the father, "I'm hungry,"  to which the father will reply, "Hi, Hungry, I'm Dad."

While the exact origin of the term dad joke is unknown, a writer for the Gettysburg Times wrote an impassioned defence of the genre in June 1987 under the headline "Don't ban the 'Dad' jokes; preserve and revere them". The term "dad jokes" received mentions in the American sitcom How I Met Your Mother in 2008 and the Australian quiz show Spicks and Specks in 2009. In September 2019, Merriam-Webster added the phrase "dad joke" to the dictionary.

Examples 

Q: What do you call a dad joke that falls on its head? A: A dud pun.
Q: On Thanksgiving, why did the turkey cross the table? A: To get to the other sides.
Q: ham sandwich walks into a bar and the bartender says A: Sorry we don't serve food here.
Q: What do you call a mermaid on a roof? A: Aerial.
Q: What does a highlighter say when it answers the phone? A: Yello!!
Q: What's Irish and comes out in the spring? A: Paddy O'Furniture.
Q: What's orange and sounds like a parrot? A: A carrot.
Q: What's the opposite of water? A: Yellow snow.
Q: Where does a sick fish go? A: The dock.
Q: What do a tick and the Eiffel Tower have in common? A: They're both Paris sites.
Q: What's the difference between a pun and a Dad joke? A: It will become apparent.
Q: What did the fish say when he swam into the wall? A: Dam!
They've tried to improve the efficiency of wind farms by playing country music around them, but it's not working because they're really just big heavy metal fans.
I used to be addicted to the hokey pokey, but I turned myself around.
Plateaus are the highest form of flattery.
My uncle just got fired from his job at the cheese factory. He kept getting in the whey.
Granddad always told me that things could be worse -- I could fall into a deep hole full of water, but I knew he meant well.
Q: Whose concert costs only 45 cents? A: 50 Cent featuring Nickelback
Does your face hurt? Because it's killing me.
Q: What armor is best for sneaking? A: Leather armor, because it's made of Hide.
Q: What do you call an elephant that doesn't matter? A: An irrelephant.

See also 

 Mom joke
 Dajare

References 

Fatherhood
Humour
Jokes
Pejorative terms